The men's long jump at the 2012 IAAF World Indoor Championships was held March 9 and 10 at the Ataköy Athletics Arena.

Medalists

Records

Qualification standards

Schedule

Results

Qualification

Qualification standard 8.00 m (Q) or at least best 8 qualified. 15 athletes from 14 countries participated.  The qualification round started at 18:22 and ended at 19:09.

Final
8 athletes from 8 countries participated. The final started at 18:53 and ended at 20:02.

References

Long Jump
Long jump at the World Athletics Indoor Championships